Loisingha is a town in Bolangir district, Odisha, India.

Geography
The town is situated on the bank of river Suktel. (which flows on the southern side of the town).

Location
National Highway 26 passes through Loisingha. 
Loisingha is 18 km from its headquarters Bolangir, towards Bargarh.

Climate

Loisingha experiences three distinct seasons: summer, monsoon and winter. Typical summer months are from February to June, with maximum temperatures ranging from 35 °C to 45 °C. May is the warmest month in Loisingha, although summer doesn't end until May. The city often receives heavy thundershowers in May (and the humidity level remains high). During the hottest months, the nights are usually very warm due to high humidity. The monsoon lasts from June to September, with moderate/high rainfall and temperatures ranging from 15 °C to 35 °C. Winter begins in October; the daytime temperature hovers around 28 °C (82 °F) while night temperature is below 15 °C for most of December and January.

Economy
Most of the people depend on agriculture. Nowadays, most of people are inclined towards the business. Many of them are managing their livelihood by the means of small businesses. The most recent trend has been that many of younger generation are migrating to other states looking for jobs or opting for jobs in after a degree or diploma in technical skill based education. As a result of all these, the per capita income of individuals has gone up nowadays. Some people depend on businesses of handicraft and weaving.

Culture and Religion
Loisingha is a culturally rich town.first of all Nuakhai with addition to Ratha Jatra and Bahuda Jatra, every year the people here celebrate the famous Janghadeo Jatra also called Kundadeo Jatra. While Jogisarda is famous for the Maha Sivaratri festival around the Jogeswara Temple, also celebrates Dola Purnima (Holi), Ganesh Puja, Saraswati Puja, Biswakarma Puja, Maa Durga Puja, Maa Samalei Puja, Gaja Laxmi Puja every year. The village also celebrate drama festival on lord Maa Laxmi, Shri Jagannatha, Sri Balabhadra based on Laxmi Puran on the occasion of Margasira month.

Educational institutions
Loisingha Junior College, Loisingha (offered Science and Arts)
Loisingha Degree College, Loisingha (offered Science and Arts )
H.K.Mahatab Govt. High School, Loisingha
Govt.(New)Girls High School, Loisingha
Saraswati Sishu Vidya Mandir, Loisingha
Basti Project U P School, Loisingha
Upper Primary School, Loisingha
M.E. School, Loisingha
Block Primary School, Loisingha
Odisha Adarsha Vidyalaya, Jharmunda, Loisingha
Dayasagar Public School (Private), Burda, Loisingha
The Queen International (Private), Loisingha

Member of Legislative Assembly
Fifteen elections were held between 1957 and 2019. Elected members from the Loisingha constituency are: [7][8]
2019: (66): Dr. Mukesh Mahaling (BJP)
2014: (66): Jogendra Behera (BJD)
2009: (66): Ramakanta Seth (Biju Janata Dal|BJD)
2004: (110): Narasingha Mishra (Congress)
2000: (110): Balgopal Mishra (BJP)
1995: (110): Balgopal Mishra (Independent)
1990: (110): Narasingha Mishra (Janata Dal)
1985: (110): Balgopal Mishra (Independent)
1980: (110): Balgopal Mishra (Independent)
1977: (110): Ram Prasad Misra (Janata Party)
1974: (110): Ananga Udaya Singh Deo (Swatantra Party)
1971: (104): Nandakishore Misra (Swatantra Party)
1967: (104): Nandakishore Misra (Swatantra Party)
1961: (45): Ram Prasad Misra (Ganatantra Parishad)
1957: (32): Ram Prasad Misra (Ganatantra Parishad)

References

External links
 Satellite map of Luisinga

Constituency

 Loisingha (Odisha Vidhan Sabha constituency)

Cities and towns in Bolangir district